Haspelmoor station is a railway station in the Haspelmoor district of the municipality of Hattenhofen, located in the district of Fürstenfeldbruck in Upper Bavaria, Germany.

References

External links

Railway stations in Bavaria
Buildings and structures in Fürstenfeldbruck (district)